The 2014 Hawaii Rainbow Warriors football team represented the University of Hawaiʻi at Mānoa in the 2014 NCAA Division I FBS football season. The team was led by third-year head coach Norm Chow and played their home games at Aloha Stadium. They were members of the Mountain West Conference in the West Division. They finished the season 4–9, 3–5 in Mountain West play to finish in fourth place in the West Division.

Schedule

Schedule Source:

Projected depth chart

References

Hawaii
Hawaii Rainbow Warriors football seasons
Hawaii Rainbow Warriors football